Katong Park MRT station is a future underground Mass Rapid Transit station on the Thomson–East Coast line situated at the boundary of the planning areas of Kallang and Marine Parade, Singapore. The station is located underneath the junction of Fort Road, Tanjong Rhu Road and Meyer Road and will serve the Katong Park.

Announced in 2014, construction of the station started in 2016. It is expected to be opened along with the Phase 4 stations of the TEL in 2024. Like Stevens and Orchard on the Thomson East Coast Line, the station will have a stacked platform arrangement, with platforms on different levels serving the two directions of the line.

History
On 15 August 2014, LTA announced that Katong Park station would be part of the proposed Thomson–East Coast line (TEL). The station will be constructed as part of Phase 4, consisting of 8 stations between Founders' Memorial and Bayshore, and is expected to be completed in 2024.

Construction has started in 2016, with completion in 2024. The construction of the  bored tunnels required the use of  diameter Earth pressure balance (EPB) machines.

The station was constructed with considerable difficulty. The site has limited space allowed for construction due to a narrow construction corridor along Meyer Road, and the ground at the station is primarily soft clay since it is built on reclaimed land. Hence, the station will have a stacked platform arrangement, similar to the DTL Promenade and Stevens stations, to avoid having to acquire more land for the construction.

Initially expected to open in 2023, the restrictions on the construction due to the COVID-19 pandemic has led to delays in the line completion, and the date was pushed to 2024.

Station details
Located underneath the junction of Fort Road, Tanjong Rhu Road and Meyer Road, the station will serve residents of nearby condominiums such as The Belvedere, The Line @ Tanjong Rhu, The Waterside, Fulcrum, De Centurion, Palazzetto, Crystal Rhu, The View @ Meyer, La Ville, Fort Gardens, Emerald East, Fortville, The Meyer Place and Meyer Residence, as well as Dunman High School. When the station is completed, it will be between the Tanjong Rhu and Tanjong Katong stations. The station code will be TE24.

References

External links

Proposed railway stations in Singapore
Mass Rapid Transit (Singapore) stations
Kallang
Marine Parade
Railway stations scheduled to open in 2024